"Battle Belongs" is a song by American contemporary Christian musician Phil Wickham. The song was released on September 4, 2020, as the lead single to his eighth studio album, Hymn of Heaven (2021). The song impacted Christian radio on October 16, 2020. Wickham co-wrote the song with Brian Johnson, and collaborated with Jonathan Smith in the production of the single.

"Battle Belongs" peaked at No. 2 on the US Hot Christian Songs chart. The song also went on to peak at No. 13 on the Bubbling Under Hot 100 chart. It has been certified gold by Recording Industry Association of America (RIAA). "Battle Belongs" was nominated for the GMA Dove Award Worship Recorded Song of the Year at the 2021 GMA Dove Awards.

Background
On September 4, 2020, Phil Wickham released "Battle Belongs" as a single. Wickham shared the story behind the song, saying:

Composition
"Battle Belongs" is composed in the key of D-flat major with a tempo of 162 beats per minute. Wickham's vocal range spans from D♭4 to A♭5.

Reception

Critical response
Jonathan Andre of 365 Days of Inspiring Media gave a positive review of the song, saying "Battle Belongs" is "a great reminder of how we should be acting, especially in 2020 in the midst of a pandemic. Whatever we're facing and the struggle that we're in, we can rest assured that the Lord fights our battles for us- we need only to be still and know He's God, giving our worries and troubles to Him, maybe even on a daily basis."

Accolades

Commercial performance
"Battle Belongs" debuted at No. 23 on the US Hot Christian Songs chart dated September 19, 2020, concurrently charting at No. 5 on the Christian Digital Song Sales chart. It went on to peak at number 2 on the chart, and spent a total of forty-five non-consecutive weeks on Hot Christian Songs Chart.

The song debuted on the Christian Airplay chart dated October 17, 2020, at No. 43. "Battle Belongs" reached number one on the Christian Airplay chart dated April 10, 2021, becoming Wickham's second chart-topping entry following since "This Is Amazing Grace" in 2014.

Music videos
The official music video for the "Battle Belongs" was availed by Phil Wickham on September 4, 2020, to YouTube. The lyric video of the song was published on Phil Wickham's YouTube channel on September 11, 2020. On September 21, 2020, Phil Wickham released the acoustic performance video of the song on YouTube. On December 21, 2020, Phil Wickham released the live performance video of "Battle Belongs" which was filmed at Harris Creek Baptist Church in Waco, Texas, during the 2020 Christmas Tour, which shows Wickham singing alongside Shane & Shane.

Track listing

Charts

Weekly charts

Year-end charts

Certifications

Release history

Other versions
 Bethel Music released a duet cover of the song, led by Brian Johnson and Jenn Johnson, on their collective album, Peace, Vol. II (2021).

References

External links
 

2020 songs
2020 singles
Contemporary Christian songs
Phil Wickham songs
Songs written by Phil Wickham